Andy Hartley Payne (November 17, 1907 – December 3, 1977) was the winner of the International Trans-Continental Footrace in 1928. He ran the  route from Los Angeles to New York City, much of it along U.S. Route 66, in 573 hours, 4 minutes, 34 seconds, (23 days) averaging  over an 84-day staged run.

Payne, a member of the Cherokee Nation, grew up in Foyil, Oklahoma which was one of the check point towns along the route of the race. His father was a friend of Will Rogers and had worked on the ranch of the latter's family during his youth.

The footrace was organized to promote U.S. Route 66 which had recently been built as a simple, well-paved route across the country, and dubbed "the main street of America". First prize was $25,000 which Payne used to pay off the mortgage on his father's farm.

Andy Payne was elected clerk to the supreme court in Oklahoma City, Oklahoma and was reelected 5 times afterwards.  {PBS documentary on the Great American Race of 1928}

He died in December 1977 at the age of 70.

See also
 Ultramarathon

References

External links
The Great American Foot Race

1907 births
1977 deaths
Cherokee Nation sportspeople
Native American sportspeople
American male ultramarathon runners
Sportspeople from Oklahoma
People from Rogers County, Oklahoma
20th-century Native Americans